Manqabad Secondary School is an Egyptian secondary school located in Manqabad, Assiut Governorate, established in 1977.

References

Schools in Egypt